Havana is an unincorporated community in Huron County, Ohio, United States.

History
Havana had its start in 1848 when the Sandusky & Mansfield Railroad was extended to that point.  A post office was established at Havana in 1851, and remained in operation until 1959. The community most likely was named after Havana, the capital of Cuba.

References

Populated places in Huron County, Ohio